The Wilno Uprising may refer to:

Vilnius Uprising (1794), an uprising of Polish-Lithuanian forces against the Russians in 1794
Operation Ostra Brama, an uprising by the Polish Home Army against the Germans in 1944